Palmona Park is a census-designated place (CDP) in Lee County, Florida, United States. The population was 1,146 at the 2010 census, down from 1,353 at the 2000 census. It is part of the Cape Coral-Fort Myers, Florida Metropolitan Statistical Area.

Geography
Palmona Park is located in northern Lee County at  (26.685998, -81.896457). It is surrounded by the North Fort Myers CDP. The southwest corner of Palmona Park is at the intersection of U.S. Route 41 (Cleveland Avenue) and Florida State Road 78 (Pine Island Road). SR 78 forms the southern border of the CDP, US 41 forms the western border, Littleton Road is the northern border, and US 41 Business (North Tamiami Trail) forms most of the eastern border.

Demographics

As of the census of 2000, there were 1,353 people, 541 households, and 326 families residing in the CDP. The racial makeup of the CDP was 94.90% White, 0.15% African American, 1.03% Native American, 0.74% Asian, 1.55% from other races, and 1.63% from two or more races. Hispanic or Latino of any race were 11.68% of the population.

There were 541 households, out of which 31.4% had children under the age of 18 living with them, 34.8% were married couples living together, 15.0% had a female householder with no husband present, and 39.6% were non-families. 30.3% of all households were made up of individuals, and 9.6% had someone living alone who was 65 years of age or older.  The average household size was 2.50 and the average family size was 3.04.

In the CDP, the population was spread out, with 26.6% under the age of 18, 10.3% from 18 to 24, 30.3% from 25 to 44, 21.1% from 45 to 64, and 11.6% who were 65 years of age or older.  The median age was 34 years. For every 100 females, there were 111.4 males.  For every 100 females age 18 and over, there were 114.5 males.

The median income for a household in the CDP was $22,617, and the median income for a family was $24,010. Males had a median income of $29,000 versus $16,979 for females. The per capita income for the CDP was $14,119.  About 15.2% of families and 21.1% of the population were below the poverty line, including 27.1% of those under age 18 and 5.4% of those age 65 or over.

References

Census-designated places in Lee County, Florida
Census-designated places in Florida